Sosy Problems is a Filipino comedy film produced by GMA Pictures and directed by Andoy Ranay. It stars Rhian Ramos, Heart Evangelista, Solenn Heussaff, and Bianca King. The film is one of the eight official entries of the 2012 Metro Manila Film Festival which began on December 25, 2012.

Cast
Heart Evangelista as Claudia Ortega
Rhian Ramos as Lizzie Consunji
Solenn Heussaff as Margaux Bertrand
Bianca King as Danielle Alvarez
Aljur Abrenica as Benjo
Alden Richards as Iñaki
Mikael Daez as Santiago Elizalde
Mikey Bustos as Denmark
Tim Yap as Jamie Yap
Barbie Forteza as Becca
Kristofer Martin as Ismael
Ricky Davao as Sebastian Alvarez
Maritoni Fernandez as Dada
Mylene Dizon as Bernice
Cherie Gil as Martina Bertrand
Agot Isidro as Glory Ortega
Johnny Revilla as Gabriel Consunji
Nova Villa as Patria
Lexi Fernandez as Stef
Bianca Pulmano as Ana
Karen Santiago as Ella

Background and development
The film was first announced on May 7, 2012, through GMA Network as they plan to release new films monthly. The original casts that was first revealed in Philippine Star was composed of Solenn Heussaff, Isabelle Daza, Bianca King while the leading men happened to be Aljur Abrenica and Mikael Daez. The newest kapuso star, Benjamin Alves was the latest addition to the cast after signing an exclusive contract to GMA Network and GMA Films. Director Mark Reyes was supposed to direct the film because Dominic Zapata was busy with the Boy Pick-Up: The Movie, but in May, Director Reyes was replaced by Andoy Ranay. The script was submitted to the Metro Manila Development Authority to be reviewed as potential Film Fest entry. On June, the film becomes one of the 8 official entries to the 2012 Metro Manila Film Festival. It will have its regular screening starting December 25, 2012. On September, director Andoy Ranay changed the title from Coño Problems to Sosy Problems.

Production
In the film, Rhian Ramos plays Lizzie, the spoiled-rich daughter of a hotelier who is a self-appointed leader of the Sosy group; Bianca King portrays Danielle, the daughter of a politician who is on the brink of being impeached from office; Solenn Heussaff is Margaux, the daughter of the former beauty queen (Cherie Gil) and the best friend and half sister of Claudia (Heart Evangelista) who is also the daughter of a beauty queen (Agot Isidro). Margaux and Claudia were competing one another from beauty to the only man they see who is Benjo (Aljur Abrenica), an all-around employee at the Polo Club.

Their main problem, however, is that their favorite hangout place, The Polo Club, which reminds them of all the memories of their “firsts” in life – including their first kisses and love affairs – is in danger of being torn down and replaced with a mall that is not so much for the rich and famous: in other words, not a “sosy” mall.

The “sosy” ladies will do everything they can in order to stop the Polo Club owners from pursuing their plans, and they will risk everything—even their poise and glamour—to achieve their goal.

Trailer
The films official trailer was released on GMA Network's YouTube account on December 10, 2012.

Music
The film's theme song is Rocco Nacino's cover of "Learning The Ways Of Love", originally sung by Peabo Bryson.

References

External links
 

2012 films
Philippine comedy films
GMA Pictures films
Films directed by Andoy Ranay